Daniel Lee may refer to:

Lee as a surname
Daniel Armand Lee (born 1980), South Korean hip hop artist, songwriter and lyricist
Daniel Curtis Lee (born 1991), American actor
Daniel Lewis Lee (1973–2020), American convicted murderer
Daniel Lee (triathlete) (born 1977), Olympic triathlete from Hong Kong
Daniel Lee (film director), Hong Kong film director
Daniel Lee (Oregon missionary), Methodist missionary in Oregon
Daniel Lee (politician) (1830–?), American politician
Daniel Lee (swimmer) (born 1990), Sri Lankan swimmer, competitor at the 2008 Summer Olympics
Daniel Lee (designer) (born 1986), creative director at Bottega Veneta
Daniel W. Lee (1919–1985), American Army officer and Medal of Honor recipient
Dan Lee (animator) (1969–2005), Canadian animator
Dan M. Lee (1926–2010), Chief Justice of the Supreme Court of Mississippi

Lee as a middle name
Daniel Lee Bedford (1947–2011), American convicted murderer, executed in Ohio
Daniel Lee Chee Hun (born 1982), winner of the second season of Malaysian Idol
Daniel Lee Corwin (1958–1998), American serial killer
Daniel Lee Fogg (born 1987), English competitive swimmer
Daniel Lee Jennings (born 1987), American former professional baseball pitcher
Daniel Lee Kolb (born 1975), American former Major League Baseball relief pitcher
Daniel Lee Lopez (1987–2015), American convicted criminal, executed in Texas
Daniel Lee Nickrent (born 1956), American botanist
Daniel Lee Redman (1889–1948), Canadian lawyer, soldier, and federal politician
Daniel Lee Rose (born 1990), English professional footballer 
Daniel Lee Siebert (1954–2008), American serial killer
Daniel Lee Snow, former member of the Little River Band
Daniel Lee Zirkle (1968–2002), American convicted murderer, executed in Virginia

Other
Daniel Lee Chee Hun (album), self-titled debut album of Daniel Lee Chee Hun

See also
Danny Lee (disambiguation)
Daniel Leigh, Sir Daniel Leigh, 1st Baronet (died 1633)
Daniel Lea, musician, commonly known as By the Fireside